Christian Martucci (born June 5, 1977) is an Italian American guitarist, vocalist and songwriter. He is a dual citizen of Italy and the United States. As of 2013, he is the lead guitar player for the American hard rock band Stone Sour and from January 1, 2019 Black Star Riders. He was born in Philadelphia, Pennsylvania and is a founding member of Thousand Watt Stare, Black President, the Strychnine Babies and the Chelsea Smiles. 
He was Dee Dee Ramone's guitarist from late 1999 to 2002 and appeared as "Chris the Creep" in Ramones's last book, Legend of a Rock Star, A Memoir: The Last Testament of Dee Dee Ramone. In recent years, he has become more known for performances with (Slipknot and Stone Sour) frontman Corey Taylor and as a touring guitarist for Stone Sour. In 2014, he became the permanent replacement for Stone Sour's guitarist Jim Root. On 17 September 2018, it was announced he would replace Damon Johnson as lead guitarist in Black Star Riders from January 1, 2019.

In 2020 it was announced that Martucci would be joining Corey Taylors solo band. The band recorded 25 songs in 2 1/2 weeks live in the studio with producer Jay Ruston. The album CMFT was released on October 2, 2020, by Roadrunner Records.

In February 2021 Martucci formed the side project Dirty O'Keeffe with Billy Gould (Faith No More), Dave Raun (Lagwagon), and Steven Shepard (Trash N’ Privilege). They released the single 'Brick or Bullet' in 2021, followed by a four song EP 'Heavy Water' in 2022.

Martucci uses or has used guitars by a variety of brands including Gibson, Gretsch, Marvin, Zemaitis, Dean and Charvel. Christian uses Dimarzio pickups and Marshall amps.

Discography
 1996: Three Song Demo Tape - The Strychnine Babies - (Vocals, guitar)
 1997: Six Songs for Self Destruction EP - The Strychnine Babies - (Vocals, bass)
 1998: Kill Society/Dead Love 7" - The Strychnine Babies - (Vocals, bass)
 1998: This is American Punk, Vol. 1 - The Strychnine Babies - (Vocals, bass)
 2003: Toolbox Murders Soundtrack - California (Back To Hell) - Shithead - (Vocals)
 2005: Nowhere Ride EP - The Chelsea Smiles - (Vocals, guitar)
 2006: Annapolis Soundtrack - Nowhere Ride - The Chelsea Smiles - (Vocals, guitar)
 2006: Flatout 2 In-Game Soundtrack - Nowhere Ride - The Chelsea Smiles - (Vocals, guitar)
 2007: Park Soundtrack - Nowhere Ride - The Chelsea Smiles - (Vocals, guitar)
 2008: Warped Tour 2008 Tour Compilation - Short List of Outspoken Suspects - Black President - (Vocals)
 2008: Black President - Black President - (Vocals, guitar)
 2010: Thousand Watt Stare EP - Thousand Watt Stare - (Vocals, guitar)
 2011: Silver Dimes - Thousand Watt Stare - (Vocals, guitar)
 2012: Heavy Hearts Benefit Compilation - Lights Out - Thousand Watt Stare - (Vocals, guitar)
 2014: Ronnie James Dio This Is Your Life - Rainbow in the Dark - Corey Taylor, Roy Mayorga, Satchel, Christian Martucci, Jason Christopher - (Rhythm Guitar)
 2015: Fear Clinic Soundtrack - The Dark - Stone Sour - (Lead Guitar)
 2015: Meanwhile in Burbank... - Stone Sour - (Lead Guitar, Backing Vocals)
 2015: Straight Outta Burbank... - Stone Sour - (Lead Guitar, Backing Vocals)
 2017: Hydrograd - Stone Sour - (Lead Guitar, Backing Vocals)
 2019: Get It Out - Altitudes & Attitude - (Lead Guitar)
 2019: Another State of Grace - Black Star Riders - (Lead Guitar, Backing Vocals)
 2019: Hello, You Bastards: Live in Reno - Stone Sour - (Lead Guitar, Backing Vocals)
 2020: CMFT - Corey Taylor - (Guitar, Vocals)
 2021: Brick Or Bullet - Dirty O'Keeffe - (Lead Vocals, Lead Guitar)
 2021: The Innermost Journey to Your Outermost Mind - Sami Yaffa - (Lead Guitar)
 2021: The Metallica Blacklist - Holier Than Thou - Corey Taylor - (Lead Guitar)
 2022: CMFB ...Sides - Corey Taylor - (Lead Guitar, Backing Vocals)
 2022: Heavy Water - Dirty O'Keeffe - (Vocals, guitar)
 2023: Wrong Side of Paradise – Black Star Riders – (Lead guitar, backing vocals)

Filmography
 New York Doll (as Christian Black) - (2005)

References

External links
 STONE SOUR RELEASE MUSIC VIDEO FOR COVER OF METAL CHURCH'S "THE DARK"
 
 Corey Taylor And Friends Rock Henry Rollins-Hosted Drop In The Bucket Benefit Event
 A Message About Our 2014 Winter Tour : Stone Sour
 LIVE SHOW REVIEW: STONE SOUR
 BLACK STAR RIDERS To Release 'Another State Of Grace' Album In September
 ALTITUDES & ATTITUDE Feat. MEGADETH's ELLEFSON, ANTHRAX's BELLO: 'Get It Out' Album Due In January

1977 births
Living people
American heavy metal guitarists
American male singers
American punk rock singers
American punk rock guitarists
Lead guitarists
Rhythm guitarists
Songwriters from Pennsylvania
Singers from Pennsylvania
Guitarists from Philadelphia
American male guitarists
Black President (band) members
Stone Sour members
21st-century American singers
American people of Italian descent